Hicri Fişek (22 September 1918 – 26 February 2002) was a Turkish professor of international law.

He founded the "Tevfik Fikret" high-school in Ankara (1964). He received the French Légion d'Honneur (Chevalier 1964; Officier 1975). Doctor honoris causa, University of Strasbourg 1974.

References

External links 
 Fisek Institute

Academic staff of the University of Strasbourg
Officiers of the Légion d'honneur
1918 births
2002 deaths
Social Democracy Party (Turkey) politicians
20th-century Turkish politicians